The Jachin en Boazkerk is a church of the Netherlands Reformed Congregations in Genemuiden, Overijssel, the Netherlands. It was built in 2003, and can hold 1,850 people.

Churches in Overijssel
Reformed church buildings in the Netherlands
Churches completed in 2003
Zwartewaterland
21st-century religious buildings and structures in the Netherlands